The Man Who Disappeared (a.k.a. Sherlock Holmes: The Man Who Disappeared) is a 1951 British made-for-television mystery film directed by Richard M. Grey and starring John Longden as Sherlock Holmes and Campbell Singer as Dr. John H. Watson. The movie is based on Arthur Conan Doyle's 1891 Sherlock Holmes story "The Man with the Twisted Lip". It was the first British attempt to create a Sherlock Holmes television series.

Production
The initial plan was to make six, one-hour adaptations but only one film was made and it was ultimately released cinematically. It was filmed both on location in London and on various studio sets.

Cast 
John Longden as Sherlock Holmes
Campbell Singer as Dr. John H. Watson
Hector Ross as Neville St. Clair
Ninka Dolega as Kate St. Clair
Beryl Baxter as Doreen
Walter Gotell (billed as Walther) as Luzatto

Reception
The film was not well regarded upon release with one reviewer saying "This three-reeler is directed and acted in a most shoddy manor and the plot development moves at some points at the most startling speed." Kinematograph described the direction as "uninspired" causing the film "to border on the burlesque."

References

External links 

The Man Who Disappeared at the Internet Archive

1951 films
1950s mystery films
British mystery films
Sherlock Holmes films
British black-and-white films
1951 television films
1950s English-language films
1950s British films